Geschwind is a German surname. Notable people with the surname include:

 Rudolf Geschwind (1829–1910), Austrian rosarian
 Norman Geschwind (1926–1984), American behavioral neurologist
 Geschwind–Galaburda hypothesis, laterality hypothesis
 Wernicke–Geschwind model, neurological model of language
 Geschwind syndrome, personality syndrome
 Daniel Geschwind, American geneticist and cousin of Norman Geschwind

German-language surnames